Recommendation for Mercy (released in the United States as Teenage Psycho Killer) is a 1975 Canadian film fictionalizing the murder trial of Steven Truscott.

Directed by Murray Markowitz, it starred Andrew Skidd, Robb Judd, and Mike Upmalis.

Notes

External links 
 "Recommendation for Mercy" at Allmovie.com
 

1975 films
English-language Canadian films
1970s biographical drama films
1975 crime drama films
Canadian biographical drama films
Canadian crime drama films
1970s legal films
Courtroom films
Drama films based on actual events
Films set in Ontario
Films shot in Ontario
Films about miscarriage of justice
1970s English-language films
1970s Canadian films

Films about capital punishment